In the seventh century the pagan Anglo-Saxons were converted to Christianity mainly by missionaries sent from Rome. Irish missionaries from Iona, who were proponents of Celtic Christianity, were influential in the conversion of 
Northumbria, but after the Synod of Whitby in 664, the Anglo-Saxon church gave its allegiance to the Pope.

Background
Christianity was present in Roman Britain from at least the third century, introduced by tradesmen, immigrants and legionaries, although most of the latter probably followed Mithraism. Diocletian's edicts of persecution, of 303 were not rigorously enforced by Constantius Chlorus. In 313, his son, Constantine, issued the "Edict of Milan" allowing the practice of Christianity in the Empire. The following year three bishops from Britain attended the Council of Arles. They were Eborius from the city of Eboracum (York); Restitutus from the city of Londinium (London); and Adelfius, the location of whose see is uncertain. The presence of these three bishops indicates that by the early fourth century, the British Christian community was already both organised on a regional basis, and had a distinct episcopal hierarchy. Around 429, the bishops of Britain requested assistance from their colleagues in Gaul in dealing with Pelagianism. Germanus of Auxerre and Lupus, Bishop of Troyes were sent. During his sojourn in Britain, Germanus, a former government official, is reported to have led the native Britons to a victory against Pictish and Saxon raiders. In 396, Victricius of Rouen was asked to go to Britain to resolve some doctrinal matters. In his De Laude Sanctorum (On the Praise of the Saints), he describes Britain as a wild and hostile place dealing with heresy and paganism.

The Anglo-Saxons were a mix of invaders, migrants and acculturated indigenous people. Before the withdrawal of the Romans, Germanic militia had been brought into Britain who had been stationed there as foederati. The migration continued with the departure of the Roman army, when Anglo-Saxons were recruited to defend Britain; and also during the period of the Anglo-Saxon first rebellion of 442. They settled in small groups covering a handful of widely dispersed local communities, and brought from their homelands the traditions of their ancestors. There are references in Anglo-Saxon poetry, including Beowulf, that show some interaction between pagan and Christian practices and values. There is enough evidence from Gildas and elsewhere that it is safe to assume some continuing form of Christianity survived. The Anglo-Saxons took control of Sussex, Kent, East Anglia and part of Yorkshire; while the West Saxons founded a kingdom in Hampshire under Cerdic, around 520.

Kent

At the end of the 6th century the most powerful ruler in mongst the Anglo-Saxon kingdoms was Æthelberht of Kent, whose lands extended north to the River Humber. He married a Frankish princess, Bertha of Paris, daughter of Charibert I and his wife Ingoberga. There were strong trade connections between Kent and the Franks. The marriage was agreed to on the condition that she be allowed to practice her religion. She brought her chaplain, Liudhard, with her. A former Roman church was restored for Bertha just outside the City of Canterbury. Dedicated to Saint Martin of Tours, it served as her private chapel.

Gregorian mission

In 595, Pope Gregory I dispatched Augustine, prior of Gregory's own monastery of St Andrew in Rome, to head the mission to Kent. Augustine arrived on the Isle of Thanet in 597 and established his base at the main town of Canterbury. Æthelberht converted to Christianity sometime before 601; other conversions then followed. The following year, hey established the Monastery of SS. Peter and Paul. After Augustine's death in 604, the monastery was named for him and eventually became a missionary school.

Through the influence of Æthelberht, his nephew Sæberht of Essex also converted, as did Rædwald of East Anglia, although Rædwald also retained an altar to the old gods. In 601 Pope Gregory sent additional missioners to assist Augustine. Among them was the monk Mellitus. Gregory wrote the Epistola ad Mellitum advising him that local temples be Christianized and asked Augustine to Christianize pagan practices, so far as possible, into dedication ceremonies or feasts of martyrs in order to ease the transition to Christianity. In 604 Augustine consecrated Mellitus as Bishop of the East Saxons. He established his see at London at a church probably founded by Æthelberht, rather than Sæberht. Another of Augustine's associates was Justus for whom Æthelberht built a church near Rochester, Kent. 
Upon Augustine's death around 604, he was succeeded as archbishop by Laurence of Canterbury, a member of the original mission.

The North

After the departure of the Romans, the church in Britain continued in isolation from that on the continent and developed some differences in approach. Their version of tradition is often called "Celtic Christianity". It tended to be more monastic-centered than the Roman, which favored a diocesan administration, and differed on the style of tonsure, and dating of Easter. The southern and east coasts were the areas settled first and in greatest numbers by the settlers and so were the earliest to pass from Romano-British to Anglo-Saxon control. The British clergy continued to remain active in the north and west. After meeting with Augustine, around 603, the British bishops refused to recognize him as their archbishop. His successor, Laurence of Canterbury, said Bishop Dagán had refused to either share a roof with the Roman missionaries or to eat with them. There is no indication that the British clergy made any attempts to convert the Anglo-Saxons. 

When Æthelfrith of Bernicia seized the neighboring kingdom of Deira, Edwin, son of Ælla of Deira fled into exile. Around 616, at the Battle of Chester, Æthelfrith ordered his forces to attack a body of monks from the Abbey of Bangor-on-Dee, "If then they cry to their God against us, in truth, though they do not bear arms, yet they fight against us, because they oppose us by their prayers." Shortly after, Æthelfrith was killed in battle against Edwin, who with the support of Rædwald of East Anglia claimed the throne. Edwin married the Christian Æthelburh of Kent, daughter of Æthelberht, and sister of King Eadbald of Kent. A condition of their marriage was that she be allowed to continue the practice of her religion. When Æthelburh traveled north to Edwin's court, she was accompanied by the missioner Paulinus of York. Edwin eventually became a Christian, as did members of his court. When Edwin was killed in 633 at the Battle of Hatfield Chase, Æthelburh and her children returned to her brother's court in Kent, along with Paulinus. James the Deacon remained behind to serve as a missioner in the kingdom of Lindsey, but Bernicia and Deira reverted to heathenism.

Insular missions

The introduction of Christianity to Ireland dates to sometime before the 5th century, presumably in interactions with Roman Britain. In 431, Pope Celestine I consecrated Palladius a bishop and sent him to Ireland to minister to the "Scots believing in Christ". Monks from Ireland, such as Finnian of Clonard, studied in Britain at the monastery of Cadoc the Wise, at Llancarfan and other places. Later, as monastic institutions were founded in Ireland, monks from Britain, such as Ecgberht of Ripon and Chad of Mercia, went to Ireland. In 563 Columba arrived in Dál Riata from his homeland of Ireland and was granted land on Iona. This became the centre of his evangelising mission to the Picts.

When Æthelfrith of Northumbria was killed in battle against Edwin and Rædwald at the River Idle in 616, his sons fled into exile. Some of that time was spent in the kingdom of Dál Riata, where Oswald of Northumbria became Christian. At the death of Edwin's successors at the hand of Cadwallon ap Cadfan of Gwynedd, Oswald returned from exile and laid claim to the throne. He defeated the combined forces of Cadwallon and Penda of Mercia at the Battle of Heavenfield. In 634, Oswald, who had spent time in exile at Iona, asked abbot Ségéne mac Fiachnaí to send missioners to Northumbria. At first, a bishop named Cormán was sent, but he alienated many people by his harshness, and returned in failure to Iona reporting that the Northumbrians were too stubborn to be converted. Aidan criticised Cormán's methods and was soon sent as his replacement.<ref>[http://justus.anglican.org/resources/bio/52.html Kiefer, James E., "Aidan of Lindisfarne, Missionary", Biographical Sketches of memorable Christians of the past", Society of Archbishop Justus. 29 August 1999]</ref> Oswald gave Aidan the island of Lindisfarne, near the royal court at Bamburgh Castle. Since Oswald was fluent in both one of the and Irish, he often served as interpreter for Aidan. Aidan built churches, monasteries and schools throughout Northumbria. Lindisfarne became an important centre of Insular Christianity under Aidan, Cuthbert, Eadfrith and Eadberht. Cuthbert's tomb became a center for pilgrimage.

Monastic foundations
Around 630 Eanswith, daughter of Eadbald of Kent, founded Folkestone Priory.

William of Malmesbury says Rædwald had a step-son, Sigeberht of East Anglia, who spent some time in exile in Gaul, where he became a Christian. After his step-brother Eorpwald was killed, Sigeberht returned and became ruler of the East Angles. Sigeberht's conversion may have been a factor in his achieving royal power, since at that time Edwin of Northumbria and Eadbald of Kent were Christian. Around 631, Felix of Burgundy arrived in Canterbury and Archbishop Honorius sent him to Sigeberht. Alban Butler says Sigeberht met Felix during his time in Gaul and was behind Felix's coming to Anglo-Saxon England. Felix established his episcopal see at Dommoc and a monastery at Soham Abbey. Although Felix's early training may have been influenced by the Irish tradition of Luxeuil Abbey, his loyalty to Canterbury ensured that the church in East Anglia adhered to Roman norms. Around 633, Sigeberht welcomed from Ireland, Fursey and his brothers Foillan and Ultan and gave them land to establish an abbey at Cnobheresburg. Felix and Fursey effected a number of conversions and established many churches in Sigeberht's kingdom. Around the same time Sigeberht established a monastery at Beodricesworth.

Hilda of Whitby was the grand-niece of Edwin of Northumbria. In 627 Edwin and his household were baptized Christian. When Edwin was killed in the Battle of Hatfield Chase, the widowed Queen Æthelburh, her children, and Hilda returned to Kent, now ruled by Æthelburh's brother, Eadbald of Kent. Æthelburh established Lyminge Abbey, one of the first religious houses to be founded in the new Anglo-Saxon kingdoms. It was a double monastery, built on Roman ruins. Æthelburh was the first abbess. It is assumed that Hilda remained with the Queen-Abbess. Nothing further is known of Hild until around 647 when having decided not to join her older sister Hereswith at Chelles Abbey in Gaul, Hild returned north. (Chelles had been founded by Bathild, the Anglo-Saxon queen consort of Clovis II.) Hild settled on a small parcel of land near the mouth of the river Ware, where under the direction of Aidan of Lindisfarne, she took up religious life. In 649, he appointed her abbess of the double monastery of Hartlepool Abbey, previously founded by the Irish recluse Hieu. In 655, in thanksgiving for his victory over Penda of Mercia at the Battle of the Winwæd, King Oswiu brought his year old daughter Ælfflæd to his kinswoman Hilda to be brought up at the abbey. (Hild was the grand-niece of Edwin of Northumbria; Oswiu was the son of Edwin's sister Acha.) Two years later, Oswiu established a double monastery at Streoneshalh, (later known as Whitby), and appointed Hild abbess. Ælfflæd then grew up there. The abbey became the leading royal nunnery of the kingdom of Deira, a centre of learning, and burial-place of the royal family.

Resolving blood feuds

Eormenred of Kent was the son of King Eadbald and grandson of King Æthelberht of Kent. Upon the death of his father, his brother Eorcenberht became king. The description of Eormenred as king may indicate that he ruled jointly with his brother or, alternatively, that as sub-king in a particular area. Upon his death, his two young sons were entrusted to the care of their uncle King Eorcenberht, who was succeeded upon his death by his son Ecgberht. Through the connivance of King Ecgberht's advisor Thunor, the sons of Eormenred were murdered. The king was viewed as having either acquiesced or given the order. In order to quench the family feud which this kinslaying would have provoked, Ecgberht agreed to pay a weregild for the murdered princelings to their sister. (Weregild was an important legal mechanism in early Germanic society; the other common form of legal reparation at this time was blood revenge. The payment was typically made to the family or to the clan.) The legend claims that Domne Eafe was offered (or requested) as much land as her pet hind could run around in a single lap. The result, whether miraculous or by the owner's guidance, was that she gained some eighty sulungs of land on Thanet as weregild, on which to establish the double monastery of St. Mildred's at Minster-in-Thanet. (cf. the story of St. Brigid's miraculous cloak).

A similar situation arose in the North. Eanflæd was the daughter of King Edwin of Northumbria. Her maternal grandfather was King Æthelberht of Kent. She was married to Oswiu, King of Bernicia. In 651, after seven years of peaceful rule, Oswiu declared war on Oswine, King of neighboring Deira. Oswine, who belonged to the rival Deiran royal family, was Oswiu's maternal second cousin.
Oswine refused to engage in battle, instead retreating to Gilling and the home of his friend, Earl Humwald. Humwald betrayed Oswine, delivering him to Oswiu's soldiers by whom Oswine was put to death. In Anglo-Saxon culture, it was assumed that the nearest kinsmen to a murdered person would seek to avenge the death or require some other kind of justice on account of it (such as the payment of weregild). However, Oswine's nearest kinsman was Oswiu's own wife, Eanflæd, also second cousin to Oswine. In compensation for her kinsman's murder, Eanflæd demanded a substantial weregild, which she then used to establish Gilling Abbey. The monastery was staffed in part by the relatives of both of their families, and given the task of offering prayers for both Oswiu's salvation and Oswine's departed soul. By founding the monastery shortly after Oswine's death, Oswiu and Eanflæd avoided the creation of a feud.

Synod of Whitby (664)

By the early 660s, Insular Christianity received from the monks of Iona was standard in the north and west, while the Roman tradition brought by Augustine was the practice in the south. In the Northumbrian court King Oswiu followed the tradition of the missionary monks from Iona, while Queen Eanflæd, who had been brought up in Kent followed the Roman tradition. The result was that one portion of the court would be celebrating Easter, while the other was still observing the Lenten fast.

At that time, Kent, Essex, and East Anglia were following Roman practice. Oswiu's eldest son, Alhfrith, son of Rhiainfellt of Rheged, seems to have supported the Roman position. Cenwalh of Wessex recommended Wilfrid, a Northumbrian churchman who had recently returned from Rome, to Alhfrith as a cleric well-versed in Roman customs and liturgy. Alhfrith gave Wilfrid a monastery he had recently founded at Ripon, with Eata, abbot of Melrose Abbey and former student of Aidan of Lindisfarne. Wilfrid ejected Abbot Eata, because he would not conform to Roman customs; and Eata returned to Melrose. Cuthbert, the guest-master was also expelled. Wilfrid introduced a form of the Rule of Saint Benedict into Ripon.

In 664, King Oswiu convened a meeting at Hild's monastery to discuss the matter. The Celtic party was led by Abbess Hilda, and bishops Colmán of Lindisfarne and Cedd of Læstingau. (In 653, upon the occasion of the marriage of Oswiu's daughter Alchflaed with Peada of Mercia, Oswiu had sent Cedd to evangelize the Middle Angles of Mercia.) The Roman party was led by Wilfrid and Agilbert.

The meeting did not proceed entirely smoothly due to variety of languages spoken, which probably included Old Irish, Old English, Frankish and Old Welsh, as well as Latin. Bede recounted that Cedd interpreted for both sides. Cedd's facility with the languages, together with his status as a trusted royal emissary, likely made him a key figure in the negotiations. His skills were seen as an eschatological sign of the presence of the Holy Spirit, in contrast to the Biblical account of the Tower of Babel.
Colman appealed to the practice of St. John; Wilfrid to St. Peter. Oswiu decided to follow Roman rather than Celtic rite, saying ""I dare not longer contradict the decrees of him who keeps the doors of the Kingdom of Heaven, lest he should refuse me admission". Some time after the conference Colman resigned the see of Lindisfarne and returned to Ireland.

Anglo-Saxon saints

A number of Anglo-Saxon saints are connected to royalty. King Æthelberht of Kent and his wife Queen Bertha were later regarded as saints for their role in establishing Christianity among the Anglo-Saxons. Their granddaughter Eanswith founded Folkestone Priory, in 630 the first monastery in the Anglo-Saxon kingdoms for women. Her aunt Æthelburh founded Lyminge Abbey about four miles northwest of Folkestone on the south coast of Kent around 634. In a number of instances, the individual retired from court to take up the religious life. The sisters Mildrith, Mildburh, and Mildgyth, great granddaughters of King Æthelberht and Queen Bertha, and all abbesses at various convents, were revered as saints. Ceolwulf of Northumbria abdicated his throne and entered the monastery at Lindisfarne.

In some cases, where the death of a member of royalty appears to be largely politically motivated, it was viewed as martyrdom due to the circumstances. The murdered princes Æthelred and Æthelberht were later commemorated as saints and martyrs. Oswine of Deira was betrayed by a trusted friend to soldiers of his enemy and kinsman Oswiu of Bernicia. Bede described Oswine as "most generous to all men and above all things humble; tall of stature and of graceful bearing, with pleasant manner and engaging address". Likewise, the sons of Arwald of the Isle of Wight were betrayed to Cædwalla of Wessex, but because they were converted and baptized by Abbot Cynibert of Hreutford immediately before being executed, they were considered saints. Edward the Martyr was stabbed to death on a visit to his stepmother Queen Ælfthryth and his stepbrother, the boy Æthelred while dismounting from his horse, although there is no indication that he was particularly noted for virtue.

Royalty could use their affiliation to such cults in order to claim legitimacy against competitors to the throne. A dynasty may have had accrued prestige for having a saint in its family. Promoting a particular cult may have aided a royal family in claiming political dominance over an area, particularly if that area was recently conquered.

Anglo-Saxon mission on the Continent

In 644, the twenty-five year old Ecgberht of Ripon was a student at the monastery of Rath Melsigi when he and many others fell ill of the plague. He vowed that if he recovered, he would become a perpetual pilgrimage from his homeland of Britain and would lead a life of penitential prayer and fasting. He began to organize a mission to the Frisians, but was dissuaded from going by a vision related to him by a monk who had been a disciple of Saint Boisil, prior of Melrose. Ecgberht then recruited others.

Around 677, Wilfrid, bishop of York quarreled with King Ecgfrith of Northumbria and was expelled from his see. Wilfrid went to Rome to appeal Ecgfrith's decision. On the way he stopped in Utrecht at the court of Aldgisl, the rulers of the Frisians, for most of 678. Wilfrid may have been blown off course on his trip from Anglo-Saxon lands to the continent, and ended up in Frisia; or he may have intended to journey via Frisia to avoid Neustria, whose Mayor of the Palace, Ebroin, disliked Wilfrid. While Wilfrid was at Aldgisl's court, Ebroin offered a bushel of gold coins in return for Wilfrid, alive or dead. Aldgisl's hospitality to Wilfrid was in defiance of Frankish domination.

The first missioner was Wihtberht who went to Frisia about 680 and labored for two years with the permission of Aldgisl; but being unsuccessful, Wihtberht returned to Briiain. Willibrord grew up under the influence of Wilfrid, studied under Ecgberht of Ripon, and spent twelve years at the Abbey of Rath Melsigi. Around 690, Ecgberht sent him and eleven companions to Christianise the Frisians. In 695 Willibrord was consecrated in Rome, Bishop of Utrecht. In 698 he established the Abbey of Echternach on the site of a Roman villa donated by the Austrasian noblewoman Irmina of Oeren. Aldgisl's successor Redbad was less supportive than his father, likely because the missionaries were favored by Pepin of Herstal, who sought to expand his territory into Frisia.

In 716, Boniface joined Willibrord in Utrecht. Their efforts were frustrated by the war between Charles Martel and Redbad, King of the Frisians. Willibrord fled to the abbey he had founded in Echternach, while Boniface returned to the Benedictine monastery at Nhutscelle. The following year he traveled to Rome, where he was commissioned by Pope Gregory II as a traveling missionary bishop for Germania.

Benedictine reform

The Benedictine reform was led by Saint Dunstan over the latter half of the 10th century. It sought to revive church piety by replacing secular canons- often under the direct influence of local landowners, and often their relatives- with celibate monks, answerable to the ecclesiastical hierarchy and ultimately to the Pope. This deeply split the newly formed kingdom of England, bringing it to the point of civil war, with the East Anglian nobility (such as Athelstan Half-King, Byrhtnoth) supporting Dunstan and the Wessex aristocracy (Ordgar, Æthelmær the Stout) supporting the secularists. These factions mobilised around King Eadwig (anti-Dunstan) and his brother King Edgar (pro). On the death of Edgar, his son Edward the Martyr was assassinated by the anti-Dunstan faction and their candidate, the young king Æthelred was placed on the throne. However this "most terrible deed since the English came from over the sea" provoked such a revulsion that the secularists climbed down, although Dunstan was effectively retired.

This split fatally weakened the country in the face of renewed Viking attacks.

Diocesan organisation
In 669 Theodore of Tarsus became Archbishop of Canterbury. In 672 he convened the Council of Hertford which was attended by a number of bishops from across the Anglo-Saxon kingdoms. This Council was a milestone in the organization of the Anglo-Saxon Church, as the decrees passed by its delegates focused on issues of authority and structure within the church. Afterwards Theodore, visiting the whole of Anglo-Saxon held lands, consecrated new bishops and divided up the vast dioceses which in many cases were coextensive with the kingdoms of the heptarchy.

See also
 Anglo-Saxon mission
 Celtic Christianity
 Christianity in Roman Britain
 Hiberno-Scottish mission
 List of Anglo-Saxon saints
 List of members of the Gregorian mission

References

Bibliography
 Chaney, William A. (1960) Paganism to Christianity in Anglo-Saxon England .
 Chaney, William A. (1970). The cult of kingship in Anglo-Saxon England: the transition from paganism to Christianity (Manchester University Press)
 Higham, N. J. (2006) (Re-)Reading Bede: the "Ecclesiastical History" in Context. London: Routledge  ; 
 
 Thomas, Charles (1981) Christianity in Roman Britain to AD 500, London: Batsford

 Yorke, Barbara (2006) The Conversion of Britain'', Harlow: Pearson Education

Further reading
 
 
 
 
 

 
 
 
 
 
 
 
 
 
 
 
 
 
 
 
 
 
 
 
 
 
 
 
 
 
 
 
 
 
 
 
 

 
 
 
 
  Accessed on 10 May 2009